Alexander Elbrächter (February 20, 1908 – May 10, 1995) was a German politician of the Christian Democratic Union (CDU) and former member of the German Bundestag.

Life 
Elbrächter belonged to the German party since 1947. He left on 20 June 1958 and joined the CDU four days later. Since 1952 Elbrächter was a councillor in Hameln. He was a member of the German Bundestag from 1953 to 1969. From 27 February to 8 October 1958 he was also a member of the European Parliament.

Literature

References

1908 births
1995 deaths
Members of the Bundestag for Lower Saxony
Members of the Bundestag 1965–1969
Members of the Bundestag 1961–1965
Members of the Bundestag 1957–1961
Members of the Bundestag 1953–1957
Members of the Bundestag for the Christian Democratic Union of Germany
Christian Democratic Union of Germany MEPs
MEPs for Germany 1958–1979